Ironia may refer to:

Ironia, New Jersey

Music
Ironía, album by Andy Andy; Best Debut Album and Tropical Album of the Year 2006 Latin Billboard Music Awards
"Ironía", 1996 song by Frankie Ruiz
"Ironía" (es), by Maná Cama Incendiada 2015
Ironías, album fifth studio album by Puerto Rican salsero Víctor Manuelle  1998 
Que Ironía (disambiguation)